Pauline Louise Richards is an Australian politician. She has been a Labor Party member of the Victorian Legislative Assembly since November 2018, representing the seat of Cranbourne.

Richards, a former Whitehorse City councillor, ran as the Labor candidate for Forest Hill at the 2014 state election, and also worked as an advisor to federal MP Mike Symon and state minister Jill Hennessy.

In 2018, Richards ran as the Labor Party candidate in the state of Cranbourne after Incumbent Labor MP Jude Perera retired. Richards won election for her first term against Liberal Party candidate, Ann-Marie Hermans.

In 2022, Richards won re-election for a second term in the seat of Cranbourne, defeating Liberal Party candidate Jagdeep Singh.

References

Year of birth missing (living people)
Living people
Australian Labor Party members of the Parliament of Victoria
Members of the Victorian Legislative Assembly
Women members of the Victorian Legislative Assembly
21st-century Australian politicians
21st-century Australian women politicians